James Peter Pattison (28 June 1886 – 31 December 1963) was an Irish Labour Party politician who served as a Teachta Dála (TD) from 1933 to 1951 and 1954 to 1957.

He was first elected to Dáil Éireann at the 1933 general election as a Labour Party TD for the Carlow–Kilkenny constituency.

When the Carlow–Kilkenny constituency was split at the 1937 general election, Pattison was re-elected for the new 3-seat Kilkenny constituency. He retained that seat through three more general elections, and was returned again for Carlow–Kilkenny when the constituency was recreated for the 1948 general election. 

In 1944, the Labour Party split and Pattison became a member of the new political movement, the National Labour Party. The split was healed when new party merged with the Labour Party in 1950.

He lost his Dáil seat at the 1951 general election to the former Fianna Fáil TD Francis Humphreys, but regained it at the 1954 general election. He was defeated again at the 1957 general election, again by a Fianna Fáil candidate, and retired from national politics.

His son, Séamus Pattison, was elected at the 1961 general election and is a former Ceann Comhairle of Dáil Éireann.

See also
Families in the Oireachtas

References

1886 births
1963 deaths
Labour Party (Ireland) TDs
National Labour Party (Ireland) TDs
Members of the 8th Dáil
Members of the 9th Dáil
Members of the 10th Dáil
Members of the 11th Dáil
Members of the 12th Dáil
Members of the 13th Dáil
Members of the 15th Dáil